Gabela Polje is a small village in the Čapljina municipality of Herzegovina, part of the Federation of Bosnia and Herzegovina, which is in turn part of Bosnia and Herzegovina.

References 

Villages in Bosnia and Herzegovina
Populated places in Čapljina